The Vulcanus in Japan programme is an industry-oriented student exchange program for EU students. It was established in 1997 by the EU-Japan Centre for Industrial Cooperation, a joint venture between the European Commission and the Japanese Ministry of Economy, Trade and Industry. Its main objective is to promote industrial cooperation between European and Japanese companies.

Goals 

The Vulcanus in Japan programme consists of industrial placements for EU students. The participants are selected from among the best applicants (about 40 out of more than 1000 applicants each year). To be eligible, students must be in the last year of their undergraduate studies or following a postgraduate course in the fields of Engineering, Sciences or Architecture. The final objective is to train a pool of future executives capable of interacting socially and professionally with Japanese people, by familiarising them with the Japanese corporate culture.

Students

The table shows the number of participants for each year by country, as well as the total number of participants, since the beginning of the Vulcanus in Japan programme.

Host companies

Requirements

To be eligible, students must meet the following requirements:
 be an EU citizen;
 be registered at an EU university on a postgraduate or an undergraduate course on at least the fourth year;
 be able to take a year out;
 be a student in one of the following fields:
 Engineering;
 Sciences;
 Architecture.

A high proficiency in English language is a sine qua non requirement for applicants.

None of the work performed by a participant in a host company, even related to research activities, can be used as thesis material.

Application and selection

The selection of participants is performed in two steps:

First, around 120 preselected students (out of 1000+) are chosen based on the documents they provided (see below). In the second phase, the final decisions are taken by the host companies.

The first selection is performed by judging the following documents, which are required for the application:
 application form
 Curriculum Vitae
 motivation letter
 recommendation letter (written by a professor)
 all the grades obtained at the university
 university grading system

The most critical information contained in the above list of documents is the student's international profile, motivation and technical skills.

After the first selection is performed, the students are given a list of host companies out of which they may pick one or two — one being already chosen by the judging board. Then the applicant must write a dedicated motivation letter for each of the host companies, which will be sent directly to the human resource department of the company. These companies perform the final selection.

Content of the programme

All the participants to the Vulcanus in Japan programme follow:
 a four-month intensive Japanese language course, which is supplemented by
 seminars related to Japan (culture, society, economy, history, etc.)
 company and factory visits
 cultural activities
 an eight-month internship in a Japanese company

Japanese language course

As Japanese language proficiency is not a requirement for the applicants (even if appreciated), the first part of the Vulcanus in Japan programme consists of a four-month intensive Japanese language course, at the rate of 5–6 hours per day, 5 days a week, taught by the teachers of a private Japanese language school. Participants who have never learned Japanese are provided the basic knowledge useful for daily life in Japan as well as basic communication in a Japanese company. During the language course, students learn about the language and about Japanese culture, history, living habits, etc.

Participants with some Japanese language skills follow classes adapted to their level.

Seminars

During the first four months of the program, participants follow seminars of about 3 hours each, led by teachers from renowned universities or companies. These seminars are related to the Japanese culture, society, economy and history, and help the participants to better understand the country.

Company and factory visits

Depending on the programme year, visits to leading companies are organized by the program for the participants to study and learn about Japanese industry. Here is a non-exhaustive list of the companies and factories visited in the past:
 Hitachi
 Panasonic
 Sanyo
 Toppan Printing
 Toyota
 Komatsu Spring
 Nissan
 Yamatake Corporation (:ja:山武 (企業))
 Fujitsu Ltd.

Cultural activities

Some of the cultural activities are organized by the EU-Japan Centre, some by the school organizing the language course. They include:
 Calligraphy
 soba, tenpura cooking, preparation of sushi, etc.
 Wind chime (fūrin) making
 Tea ceremony
 Sumo tournament watching
 Indigo dye
 Zazen

Activities vary depending on the year of participation, but they are intended for participants to learn more about Japanese culture.

Internship
The internships start in January and last till August. Placement, accommodation, tasks and schedules vary greatly and depend on the hosting company. During the internship students are required to write monthly reports to keep track of their records.

All participants receive information on local Japanese language schools, but the continuation of language studies is voluntary.

Scholarship

Each participant is awarded a scholarship. Until 2008/2009, the amount was €15,000 for one year. After the economic crisis, from 2009/2010 the scholarship is given in yen, and the amount has been set at ¥2,000,000. Starting with the 2013/2014 session, the scholarship amount has been reduced to ¥1,900,000. It covers the round-trip plane ticket to Japan and living expenses.

Housing is provided and financed by the hosting company for the whole duration of the program. The Japanese language course is financed by the programme.

See also

Student exchange
European Commission
Japanese Ministry of Economy, Trade & Industry

External links
Vulcanus in Japan on the EU-Japan website (English and Japanese).
Vulcanus in Japan alumni website

Student exchange